Events in the year 1830 in India.

Events
National income - ₹9,100 million
 Mysore rebellion.
 Scottish Church College
 Thuggee and Dacoity Department
 Vellore Central Prison

Law
Illusory Appointments Act (British statute)
Debts Recovery Act (British statute)
Infants' Property Act (British statute)
Colonial Offices Act (British statute)

See also

References

 
India
Years of the 19th century in India